Biryuchya Kosa is a rural locality (a selo) and the administrative center of Biryuchekosinsky Selsoviet, Limansky District, Astrakhan Oblast, Russia. The population was 945 as of 2010. There are 8 streets.

Geography 
Biryuchya Kosa is located 41 km southeast of Liman (the district's administrative centre) by road. Zaburunnoye is the nearest rural locality.

References 

Rural localities in Limansky District